Eric Fernando Botteghin (born 31 August 1987) is a Brazilian professional footballer who plays as a centre back for Italian club Ascoli.

Career
Botteghin played in the youth academy of Grêmio Barueri, but was also loaned out to Internacional for one season. In January 2007, Botteghin moved from Grêmio Barueri to FC Zwolle in the Netherlands. In 2011, he joined NAC Breda. After two seasons he transferred to FC Groningen.

He helped the Green-White Army win the KNVB Cup in 2014–15 against defending champions PEC Zwolle. It was their first major trophy and they qualified for the UEFA Europa League.

In 2015 he moved to Feyenoord. In November 2017 he signed a new contract until 2020.

On 22 April 2018, he played as Feyenoord won the 2017–18 KNVB Cup final 3–0 against AZ Alkmaar.

Botteghin signed a one-year contract extension with Feyenoord on 22 July 2020, keeping him at the club until 2021. He left the club after the 2020–21 season, after his contract was not extended.

On 3 August 2021, he signed a two-year contract with Ascoli in Italy.

Career statistics

Honours
Groningen 
KNVB Cup: 2014–15

Feyenoord
 Eredivisie: 2016–17
 KNVB Cup: 2015–16, 2017–18
 Johan Cruijff Shield: 2017, 2018

References

1987 births
Footballers from São Paulo
Living people
Association football central defenders
Brazilian footballers
PEC Zwolle players
NAC Breda players
FC Groningen players
Feyenoord players
Ascoli Calcio 1898 F.C. players
Eredivisie players
Eerste Divisie players
Serie B players
Brazilian expatriate footballers
Expatriate footballers in the Netherlands
Brazilian expatriate sportspeople in the Netherlands
Expatriate footballers in Italy
Brazilian expatriate sportspeople in Italy